John Aldrech Ramos (born April 3, 1988) is a Filipino professional basketball player for the Terrafirma Dyip of the Philippine Basketball Association (PBA). At 6'6", he plays both the small forward and power forward positions. Ramos is also a decent outside shooter. He was part of the FEU Tamaraws team who played back to back finals in seasons 73 and 74 against the Ateneo Blue Eagles.

College career
Ramos spent his college career in FEU for four years. During his sophomore campaign, he tallied a double-double including a collegiate career high 22 points with 13 rebounds on a 90-63 blowout against UST Growling Tigers on August 6, 2009. On his third year with the Tamaraws, he averaged 10.8 points, 8.2 rebounds and 1.8 blocks per game helping the number one seed Tamaraws to a 12-2 record. He finished third in MVP voting that year, losing to his teammate RR Garcia.

College statistics

*Stats courtesy of Inboundpass.com

Professional career

Ramos declared for the PBA draft after his final stint with the Tamaraws. He was selected fifth overall by the Barako Bull but then later traded to B-Meg in exchange for Sean Anthony and that year's 12th pick (who turned out to be Dave Marcelo).

On January 22, 2013, Ramos was once again acquired by Barako Bull together with JC Intal and Jonas Villanueva from the Mixers in exchange for Alex Mallari, Leo Najorda, Lester Alvarez plus Petron’s 2014 first round pick. He was then sent to Alaska Aces on the same day in exchange for Mac Baracael. He scored 15 points and grabbed four rebounds in a loss against the Meralco Bolts on December 9, 2012.

On March 10, 2014, Ramos was dealt to Air21 (now known as the NLEX Road Warriors) in exchange for Vic Manuel.

On August 25, 2015, Ramos was traded by NLEX to Mahindra Enforcer, together with Niño Canaleta and Rob Reyes for Troy Rosario.

On October 31, 2016, Ramos was traded again, this time to the Star Hotshots in exchange for Alex Mallari.

PBA career statistics

As of the end of 2022–23 season

Season-by-season averages

|-
| align=left rowspan=2| 
| align=left | San Mig Coffee
| rowspan=2|31 || rowspan=2|7.6 || rowspan=2|.526 || rowspan=2|.286 || rowspan=2|.636 || rowspan=2|1.2 || rowspan=2|.1 || rowspan=2|.1 || rowspan=2|.2 || rowspan=2|3.1
|-
| align=left | Alaska
|-
| align=left rowspan=2| 
| align=left | Alaska
| rowspan=2|38 || rowspan=2|20.7 || rowspan=2|.429 || rowspan=2|.333 || rowspan=2|.737 || rowspan=2|3.6 || rowspan=2|.4 || rowspan=2|.2 || rowspan=2|.4 || rowspan=2|6.4
|-
| align=left | Air21
|-
| align=left | 
| align=left | NLEX
| 36 || 19.7 || .424 || .397 || .609 || 3.2 || .4 || .1 || .3 || 6.1
|-
| align=left | 
| align=left | Mahindra
| 35 || 26.7 || .512 || .475 || .900 || 5.7 || .8 || .5 || .5 || 13.3
|-
| align=left | 
| align=left | Star
| 50 || 16.8 || .487 || .493 || .735 || 3.5 || .8 || .2 || .3 || 7.5
|-
| align=left | 
| align=left | Magnolia
| 44 || 14.7 || .370 || .319 || .840 || 2.4 || .6 || .3 || .3 || 6.3
|-
| align=left | 
| align=left | Magnolia
| 34 || 12.1 || .383 || .309 || .692 || 2.4 || .5 || .1 || .7 || 4.8
|-
| align=left | 
| align=left | Terrafirma
| 11 || 22.9 || .507 || .433 || .846 || 4.0 || 1.5 || .5 || .4 || 8.7
|-
| align=left | 
| align=left | Terrafirma
| 22 || 25.8 || .461 || .417 || .667 || 5.2 || 1.3 || .2 || .6 || 9.8
|-
| align=left | 
| align=left | Terrafirma
| 30 || 22.7 || .454 || .354 || .800 || 4.4 || .9 || .2 || .7 || 7.2
|-class=sortbottom
| align=center colspan=2 | Career
| 331 || 18.3 || .452 || .388 || .775 || 3.5 || .7 || .2 || .4 || 7.2

References

External links
 
 

1988 births
Living people
Air21 Express players
Alaska Aces (PBA) players
Basketball players from Cebu
Cebuano people
FIBA 3x3 World Tour players
Filipino men's 3x3 basketball players
Magnolia Hotshots players
NLEX Road Warriors players
Philippine Basketball Association All-Stars
Philippines men's national basketball team players
Filipino men's basketball players
Power forwards (basketball)
Sportspeople from Cebu City
Terrafirma Dyip players
FEU Tamaraws basketball players
Barako Bull Energy draft picks